Roberto Rivas may refer to:

 Roberto Rivas (footballer), Salvadoran football player born in 1941 – died in 1972
 Roberto Rivas Reyes, Nicaraguan Supreme Electoral Council President